Algerian hip hop music, as a genre, includes the hip hop music of both native Algerians and Algerians abroad. Algerians living abroad have contributed much to this genre, especially in France, where they are also considered part of the French hip hop scene. Some of these Algerians have become prominent. Algeria also has a hip hop scene, which, while less well-known internationally, is among the most developed in Africa and the Arab world.

Algerian rap began in 1988, the first group of rappers was Intik followed by Hamma Boys. In 1990 Hip Hop is well known among the youth in 1990 On month of October of that year thousands of schoolchildren and young adults rose up to fight against rising food prices and neglect of the education system. Some were killed by the Army. It was at this time that many current artists began writing their raps. Youcef of the group Intik began writing "about the system, the government, because the more that you asked questions, the more you discovered... And as soon as you begin to reflect, you begin to have answers." Algerian rap speaks about the reality of day-to-day life torn by "political injustice, terror, and war", its goal being to give hope to the younger generation.

The Algerian crew MBS, founded in the late 1980s is considered the most popular Algerian hip hop group. Another group is Intik, which mixes different type of music and languages.

References

 
Hip hop